Émilien Pacini (17 November 1811 in Paris – 23 November 1898 in Neuilly-sur-Seine) was a 19th-century French librettist of Italian origin.

He was the son of composer and music publisher Antonio Pacini and Jacqueline Rosier. His sister Eugénie Jeanne Pacini, was the mother of Antony Choudens, composer and music publisher. Émilien Pacini worked in the administration of theaters and occupied the functions of theater censor at the Interior Ministry. A friend of Rossini, he wrote the lyrics of the cantata composed by the latter for the International Exposition (1867) in Paris.

Works 
He wrote the following librettos:
1837: Stradella, opera, in collaboration with Émile Deschamps, music by Louis Niedermeyer, Opéra Garnier, 3 March
1840: Loyse de Montfort, cantata, in collaboration with Émile Deschamps, music by François Bazin, Garnier, 7 October
1841: French version of Der Freischütz, music by Carl Maria von Weber, récitatifs by Hector Berlioz, Garnier, 7 June
1850: Les Deux princesses, opéra comique, music by Wilfrid d'Indy, January
1850: La Rédemption, mystère in 5 parts with prologue and épilogue, with Émile Deschamps, music by Giulio Alary, Théâtre-Italien, 14 April
1854: Cordélia, opera, in collaboration with Émile Deschamps, music by Séméladis, Versailles, April
1856: French version of Il trovatore, by Giuseppe Verdi (la Monnaie in Brussels, 20 May ; Garnier, 12 January 1857)
1859: La Perle de Frascati, opéra comique, music by Amédée de Roubin, Rouen, February
1860: Pierre de Médicis, opera, in collaboration with Jules-Henri Vernoy de Saint-Georges, music by Joseph Poniatowski, Garnier, 9 March
1862: Erostrate, opéra, en collaboration avec Joseph Méry, music by Ernest Reyer (Bade, 21 August ; Garnier, 16 October 1871

Bibliography 
 Joël-Marie Fauquet (direction) (préf. Joël-Marie Fauquet), Dictionnaire de la Musique en France au XIXe siècle, Paris, Fayard, 2003, 1405 p., (p.|927)

External links 
 Émilien Pacini on artlyriquefr

1811 births
Writers from Paris
French opera librettists
Chevaliers of the Légion d'honneur
1898 deaths
19th-century French writers
19th-century French male writers
French people of Italian descent